The 1927 New York state election was held on November 8, 1927, to elect a judge of the New York Court of Appeals, as well as all members of the New York State Assembly. Nine amendments to the New York Constitution were also proposed.

History
In 1927, there was only one state officer to be elected statewide: a judge of the Court of Appeals, to succeed Benjamin N. Cardozo, who had been elected Chief Judge in 1926. John F. O'Brien was appointed in January 1927 to fill the vacancy temporarily.

The Democratic state convention met on September 29 at the Harmanus Bleecker Hall in Albany, New York. The incumbent John F. O'Brien was nominated to succeed himself.

The Republican state convention met on September 30 in Rochester, New York, and endorsed the Democratic nominee John F. O'Brien.

Result
The jointly nominated incumbent O'Brien was re-elected.

Notes

See also
New York state elections

1927
1927 New York (state) elections